Šmartno ob Dreti is a village on the Dreta River in the Municipality of Nazarje in Slovenia. The area belongs to the traditional region of Styria and is now included in the Savinja Statistical Region.

Church

The local parish church in the centre of the village is dedicated to Saint Martin and belongs to the Roman Catholic Diocese of Celje. It was first mentioned in documents dating to 1426, but has numerous later additions.

Gallery

References

External links

Šmartno ob Dreti on Geopedia

Populated places in the Municipality of Nazarje